Phyllostachys rubromarginata, the reddish bamboo or red margin bamboo, is a species of Phyllostachys bamboo, native to Central China, specifically Guangxi and Guizhou.

Name
Its common name comes from the colorization of the margins of the newly sprouted culm sheaths, exhibiting a reddish stripe. It was classified by the Smithsonian's Floyd McClure in 1940. In China, it is named hongbian zhu or nuer zhu (maiden's bamboo).

Description
Red margin bamboo is a cold-hardy, temperate mountain bamboo which grows and spreads quickly, creating a tall screen, and reproducing by running underground rhizomes.

Phyllostachys rubromarginata culms may reach as high as 4 to 9 m (13 to 29 ft), while in China, it is reported as high as 16 m (52 ft). Mature culms grow from 2.5 to 6 cm (1.0 to 2.4") in diameter with dark green internodes 22–31 cm (8.66–12.20 in) apart. It is cold tolerant to between −16 and −24 °C (3.2° and −11.2 °F).

Usage and distribution
Its high-quality timber is used in basket making, and has become a popular ornamental plant in North America. The shoots are edible.  It grows wild in Guangxi and Guizhou as scrub and along banks of gullies. It is commonly cultivated in Henan, China.

References

 Lingnan University Science Bulletin. Canton [Guangzhou] 9:44. 1940

rubromarginata
Endemic flora of China
Flora of Guizhou
Flora of Guangxi
Grasses of China